A waffle iron or waffle maker is a kitchen utensil used to cook waffles between two hinged metal plates. Both plates have gridded indentations to shape the waffle from the batter or dough placed between them. The plates are heated and the iron is closed while the waffle bakes. Waffles are a dessert with a light and sweet flavor, similar to pancakes. Their appearance is much harder to achieve than a pancake's without a waffle iron. Similar technology is employed to bake wafers, and several other snacks including , a waffle-shaped but crunchy Indonesian snack which can be made with both sweet and savoury flavours.

History

Waffle irons were common in France as early as the 12th or 13th century, and became widespread in the Netherlands and the rest of Europe from the 14th century. Secular waffle irons developed alongside host presses, a similar but religious tool used to produce sacramental bread. The earliest waffle irons had shallow indentations suited to baking unleavened wafers, and might better be described as wafer irons or wafer presses. Waffle irons gained deeper indentations as leavening agents were introduced into recipes. There is evidence of primitive waffle irons in Sweden and Norway in Viking Age women's burials.

Waffle irons were originally constructed of two hinged iron plates connected to two long, wooden handles. The plates were often made to imprint elaborate patterns on the waffle, including coats of arms, landscapes, or religious symbols. Waffles would be held at a distance and baked over the hearth fire.

In 1869, American Cornelius Swartwout patented the stove-top waffle iron. While waffle irons of sorts may have existed since the 1400s, Swarthout intended to perfect the design by adding a handle and a hinge that swiveled in a cast-iron collar, allowing the waffle-maker to flip the iron without danger of slippage or burns. In 1891 John Kliembach, a German immigrant living in Shamokin, Pennsylvania, became a traveling salesman of waffles after fashioning an iron for the Mansion House Hotel. Kliembach sold waffles for a penny each or ten cents for a dozen. This was popular at the Chicago World's Fair. In 1911, General Electric produced a prototype electric waffle iron, and production began around 1918. Later, as the waffle iron became more prevalent, its appearance was improved.

Varieties
Traditional waffle irons are attached to tongs with wooden handles and held over an open flame, or set on a stove. Most modern waffle irons are self-contained tabletop household appliances using electric heating elements controlled by internal thermostats. Electric irons can come with either removable or non-removable plates. Professional waffle irons are usually made of uncoated cast iron, whereas domestic models, particularly cast aluminum ones, are often Teflon coated. Many have a light that goes off when the iron reaches a set temperature.

Some waffle makers produce a very thin waffle, and can be used for making waffle cones or Pizzelle. While there is no set standard for waffle shapes or thicknesses, models that produce the most common shapes and thicknesses are often labeled as "traditional" or "classic". Models that make thicker and larger pocketed waffles are often labeled as "Belgian". In the US, the most common criteria for "Belgian waffles" are their thickness and pocket size, although they are also distinguished by using a base that typically includes yeasted batter and pearl sugar.

Stroopwafels are thin, round waffle cookie made from two layers of sweet baked dough held together by caramel filling. They are a well-known Dutch treat, popular throughout the Netherlands and the former Dutch Empire, and exported abroad.

Gallery

See also

 Brown Bobby, a triangular American donut made in a waffle iron–like machine 
 Krampouz, a French manufacturer of small cooking appliances 
 List of cooking appliances
 Pancake machine
 Sandwich toaster, various machines, often waffle iron sized, that press and cook a filling between two slices of bread, to make a hot filled sandwich, with the edges sealed together

Notes

References

External links

 Food Timeline—history notes: waffles
 Theory and Technology of Waffles
 Waffle Iron Patented

Cooking appliances
Waffles
American inventions